The discography of British electronic producers Modestep consists of two albums, five extended plays, fourteen singles, one feature, and five remixes.

Studio albums

EPs

Singles

As lead artist

As featured artist

Remixes

Other appearances

Music videos

References 

Discographies of British artists
Electronic music discographies